Joseph Kinsley Steward Leopold (born 8 June 1989) is a Mauritian footballer who plays for AS Port-Louis 2000 and the national team as a goalkeeper. He was arrested for alleged drug dealing in September 2016, and was subjected to a travel ban.

References

1989 births
Living people
Mauritian footballers
Mauritius international footballers
AS Port-Louis 2000 players
Mauritian Premier League players
Association football goalkeepers